Mahakali is the ninth solo studio album by Jarboe, released on October 14, 2008 by The End Records.

Accolades

Track listing

Personnel
Adapted from the Mahakali liner notes.

 Jarboe – lead vocals, keyboards, electronics, production, recording, musical arrangements
Musicians
 Jeff Eber – drums
 Kris Force – violin, mastering
 Josh Graham – guitar
 Kevin Hufnagel – guitar
 Julia Kent – cello
 Colin Marston – guitar, production, recording, engineering, mixing, musical arrangements
 Vincent Signorelli – drums
 Cedric Victor – bass guitar, electronics, production (13), musical arrangements (13)

Additional musicians
 Phil Anselmo – vocals (8)
 Attila Csihar – vocals (6)
Production and additional personnel
 Chris Griffin – engineering, mixing, mastering
 Scott Hull – mixing (3)
 Specialprojects for Discreetcases – cover art
 David Troia – recording (8)

Release history

References

External links 
 

2008 albums
Jarboe albums
The End Records albums
Season of Mist albums
Albums produced by Jarboe
Indian mythology in music